Gatley railway station is on the Styal Line in Greater Manchester, England. It serves the village of Gatley in the Metropolitan Borough of Stockport. 

The station was opened by the London & North Western Railway in 1909; it was first known as Gatley for Cheadle, before being renamed Gatley on 6 May 1974.

The station is on the A560 Gatley Road and has a car park. The ticket office and waiting room, on the Manchester-bound platform, are only open in the morning.

Gatley station re-opened on 28 January 2007, after reconstruction of the platforms and work to replace the ramp access to them. 2010 saw the installation of electronic train service information screens on each platform. In 2018, Northern introduced ticket machines, which are on the northbound platform and at the bottom of the ramp for the southbound platform.

Work to extend the platforms at the station is expected to be completed by March 2023.

Services

Historical
When the Styal line was electrified in 1960, there was half-hourly electric service (Monday - Saturday) between Manchester Oxford Road and Alderley Edge operated by AM4 (Class 304) EMUs. Services were extended to Altrincham, when the M&SJR was re-electrified at 25 kV AC in 1971, and operated in this way until the line between Altrincham and Cornbrook Junction was transferred to Manchester Metrolink in 1990.

When Manchester Airport railway station opened in 1993, the Monday to Saturday service pattern was 2 trains per hour to Manchester Piccadilly. 2 trains per hour operated in the opposite direction - one to Manchester Airport and the other continued onto Crewe until 17:00, then terminated at Wilmslow in the evening. Sunday services consisted of 1 train per hour to Manchester Airport, with one service every 2 hours continuing to Alderley Edge and 1 train an hour to Manchester Piccadilly.

Present

References

Further reading

External links

Railway stations in the Metropolitan Borough of Stockport
DfT Category E stations
Former London and North Western Railway stations
Railway stations in Great Britain opened in 1909
Northern franchise railway stations
Railway stations served by TransPennine Express